Semih Dağlar (born 8 January 1993) is a Turkish footballer who plays as a forward for Hammer SpVg.

References

External links
 

Turkish footballers
German footballers
Association football forwards
Sportfreunde Lotte players
3. Liga players
Sportspeople from Münster
1993 births
Living people
Hammer SpVg players
Footballers from North Rhine-Westphalia